Valley Gardens is a neighborhood of Louisville, Kentucky, in the United States. It is centered along Johnsontown Road and Terry Road.

Geography

References
  

Neighborhoods in Louisville, Kentucky